Remezcla is an American media company focusing on the Latin American cultural sphere. It serves the millennial market.

History 
The brand was founded by Claire Frisbie, Andrew Herrera and Nuria Net in 2006, had no outside funding; it first received external funding in 2017, from the Hemisphere Media Group, which was used to "aggressively" expand its video content production. It is operated by members of its own demographic, young Latinos. Its Editor-in-chief is Andrea Gompf, who encountered the brand as a magazine when it emerged in 2008. In 2018, Gompf said that she "fell in love with its fresh voice and perspective" immediately, as it was the first publication she felt represented her as a U.S.-born Latina. She then emailed the company asking for a job when it was still a recommendations newsletter and culture blog. It launched a revamped website in 2014 and moved to a full time headquarters in Bushwick, Brooklyn with 35 employees in 2016.

In 2019 it won the Best Social Video: Food & Drink award at the Webby Awards, for "Chinese Latinos Explain Chino-Latino Food", and partnered with Infiniti to create a series of cultural events, including publicizing street food and art. It also expanded its influence in 2019, being one of the companies invited by The Black List to create The Latinx List, with an aim of improving Latin representation in Hollywood. Film and TV editor Vanessa Erazo said they "hope to spotlight screenwriters who will create opportunities for Latino talent to thrive in front of the camera and behind it".

References 

2008 establishments in New York City
Companies based in Brooklyn
Mass media in Mexico
Mass media in the United States
Mass media companies established in 2008